Aadarsha is a Gaupalika in Doti District in the Sudurpashchim Province of far-western Nepal. 
Aadarsha has a population of 23945.The land area is 128.47 km2.

References

Rural municipalities in Doti District
Rural municipalities of Nepal established in 2017